Isiro (pronounced ) is the capital of Haut-Uele Province in the northeastern part of the Democratic Republic of the Congo. It lies between the equatorial forest and the savannah and its main resource is coffee.  Isiro's population is estimated at approximately 182,000. Most people speak, Pa-Zande (Zande language), Lingala, Swahili and which is somehow uncommon.

History
Isiro was named Paulis after colonel, later diplomat, Albert Paulis when it was part of the Belgian Congo.  The city was developed in 1934 and reached its peak in 1957.
In the troubled days of Congo's independence and its aftermath, operation Black Dragoon brought fighting between Belgian paratroopers and local Simba militias.

In 1998, Isiro became the home of a newly created Dominican-operated university called Université d'Uélé.  It is the third city in Orientale province (after Kisangani and Bunia) to welcome a university.

Transport
Isiro is served by Matari Airport, a national airport with flights to Kinshasa, the capital. The isolated narrow gauge Vicicongo line to the river port of Bumba on the Congo River is not currently operational. The dirt roads to and from Isiro allow commercial trade with Uganda and South Sudan, in principle, but may be impassable in the wet season.

People
Isiro is the birthplace of Marie Daulne, Leader of the group Zap Mama.

See also
Roman Catholic Diocese of Isiro–Niangara

References

 
Populated places in Haut-Uélé